The naval Battle of Cape Bon took place on December 13, 1941 during the Second World War, between two Italian light cruisers and an Allied destroyer flotilla off Cape Bon in Tunisia.

Background
When Italy declared war in June 1940, the Regia Marina was one of the largest navies in the world but it was restricted to the Mediterranean. The British Empire possessed enough resources and naval might to maintain a strong presence in the area and replace most losses by redeploying ships. This led to caution by the Italian command and a tendency to avoid conflict. Control of the Mediterranean was disputed by the Regia Marina the Royal Navy and their allies. The sea was vital for the supply of the Italian and German forces in North Africa, as well as the maintenance of Malta as a British offensive base. Without Malta, Britain could not intercept Italian convoys to prevent the supply of Axis forces.

The possession of radar and the breaking of Italian codes, particularly the Boris Hagelin C38 cipher machine used by the Regia Marina, further contributed to British success. In November 1941, the supply of the Axis forces in Libya from Italy, had been interrupted by Force K, which had destroyed several Italian convoys (most notably the Duisburg convoy) and the loss of nearly 70 percent of the supplies sent to Libya, including 92 percent of the fuel. Force K based at Malta, and ships from Alexandria, intercepted an Axis convoy Maritza and Procida, escorted by two Italian torpedo boats, sailing from Greece to Benghazi of on 24 November. The loss of the cargoes led the German command to report that the fuel situation of the Luftwaffe in North Africa was critical.

The Italian and German forces in North Africa, facing Operation Crusader, a new Allied offensive, were in urgent need of fuel and ammunitions. Supermarina (the general staff of the Royal Italian Navy), at the request of Comando Supremo (supreme command of the Italian armed forces), developed an emergency plan to shift supplies using warships. The Alberico da Barbiano and Alberto di Giussano, light cruisers of the 4th Cruiser Division and commanded by ammiraglio di divisione  (divisional admiral) Antonino Toscano, were fast and too lightly armored for employment with the battle fleet and were selected for this role.

The fuel, contained in unsealed barrels, was placed on the stern deck, creating a grave risk of fire from British gunfire and from the discharge of the ships' own guns, preventing the use of the stern turrets unless the fuel was jettisoned. The two cruisers sailed unescorted from Palermo at 17:20 on 9 December, heading for Tripoli. At 22:56, when north of Pantelleria, they were spotted by a British reconnaissance aircraft, which had been directed to the area by Ultra intercepts, and which started to shadow them. At 23:55, Toscano (who was at that time in the middle of the Sicilian Channel) decided to turn back to base, as the surprise required for the success of the mission had vanished, much British radio traffic foreshadowed air attack, and worsening sea conditions would delay the ships, further exposing them to British attacks. Da Barbiano and Di Giussano reached Palermo at 8:20 on 10 December, after overcoming a British air attack off Marettimo. Toscano was heavily criticized by the Supermarina for his decision to abort the mission.

Prelude

Convoy M. 41, was planned for 13 December but air cover by aircraft based in Libya would be impossible unless they received fuel from Italy. On 12 December it was decided that the 4th Division would attempt again the trip to Tripoli. The cruiser Bande Nere was to join Da Barbiano and Di Giussano to carry more supplies but she was prevented from sailing by a breakdown and the cargo was transferred to the other two cruisers. The stern of Da Barbiano (and to a lesser extent, Di Giussano) was packed with fuel barrels, so thickly that it was not possible to traverse the guns; Toscano held a briefing with his staff and officers from both ships, where it was decided that, in case of encounter with enemy ships, the barrels would be thrown overboard to enable the ships to open fire. Da Barbiano, Di Giussano and their only escort, the torpedo boat  (a second torpedo boat, was left in the port due to a breakdown), sailed from Palermo at 18:10 on 12 December. Air cover, air reconnaissance and defensive MAS ambushes were planned to safeguard the convoy.

By 8 December, the British had de-coded Italian C-38 wireless signals about the Italian supply operation and its course for Tripoli.

Following new Ultra decodes a new reconnaissance plane was sent and spotted Toscano's ships at sunset on 12 December, after which the 4th Destroyer Flotilla was directed to intercept the two cruisers, increasing speed to 30 knots. This speed, along with a one-hour delay that the 4th Division had accrued (and that Toscano omitted to report to Supermarina), frustrated all previous Supermarina calculations about the advantage that the 4th Division would have. At 22:23 Toscano was informed that he would possibly meet "enemy steamers coming from Malta", and at 23:15 he ordered action stations.

Battle

12/13 December, night
The 4th Destroyer Flotilla sighted the Italian cruisers near Cap Bon, at 02:30 on 13 December. At 2:45 on 13 December, seven miles off Cape Bon, the Italian ships heard the noise of a British plane (a radar-equipped Vickers Wellington, which located the ships and informed Stokes about their position), and at 3:15 they altered course to 157° to pass about a mile off Cape Bon. Five minutes later, Toscano suddenly ordered full speed ahead and to alter course to 337°, effectively reversing course; this sudden change disrupted the Italian formation, as neither Cigno (which was about two miles ahead of the cruisers) nor Di Giussano (which was following Da Barbiano in line) received the order, and while Di Giussano saw the flagship reverse course and imitated her (but remained misaligned) Cigno did not noticed the change until 3:25, when she also reversed course, but remained much behind the two cruisers.

13 December, morning
Stokes's destroyers were just off Cape Bon by then and they had spotted the Italian ships. Arriving from astern, under the cover of darkness and using radar, the British ships sailed close inshore and surprised the Italians, who were further out to sea, by launching torpedoes from short range. The course reversal accelerated the approach between the two groups and the Allied destroyers attacked together; Sikh fired her guns and four torpedoes against Da Barbiano (less than  distant), Legion did the same, Isaac Sweers opened fire against Di Giussano and Maori fired six torpedoes against Di Giussano. Toscano ordered full speed and to open fire (and ordered Di Giussano to increase speed to ). Da Barbiano also started a turn to port (on orders from Captain Giorgio Rodocanacchi), but at 3.22, before her guns were able to fire (only some machine guns managed to), the cruiser was hit by a torpedo below the foremost turret, which caused her to list to port. Da Barbiano was then raked with machine gun fire, which killed or wounded many men and set fire to the fuel barrels, and was hit by a second torpedo in the engine room.

At 3.26 Maori fired two torpedoes at Da Barbiano and opened fire with her guns, hitting the bridge. The cruiser was hit soon after by another torpedo in the stern (possibly launched by Legion) and Di Giussano was also hit by a torpedo and gunfire, being left disabled. The land behind the Allied destroyers made it impossible for the Italians to see them and Di Giussano managed to fire only three salvoes. In five minutes both cruisers were disabled; Da Barbiano rapidly listed to port, while fires quickly spread all over the ship and into the sea by the floating fuel; the crew abandoned ship. At 3:35, Da Barbiano capsized and sank in a sea of flame, with Toscano, Rodocanacchi and another 532 men still aboard. Di Giussano was left dead in the water with fires raging; the crew struggled to keep the ship afloat but she also had to be abandoned, breaking in two and sinking at 4:20, with the loss of 283 men. After a brief encounter with the Dutch destroyer Isaac Sweers, Cigno rescued nearly 500 survivors; others reached the coast and another 145 men were later saved by Italian Motoscafo armato silurante motor torpedo boats; Italian losses amounted to 817 men.

Aftermath

Analysis
Toscano's decision to reverse course has never been fully explained, but various possibilities have been suggested. He may have decided to turn back after realizing that he had been spotted by aircraft, as he did on 9 December; however, a course towards the Aegadian islands would have made more sense, instead of the north-westerly course ordered by Toscano. The course change was ordered more than 30 minutes after the cruisers had been spotted; Toscano may have wanted to mislead the reconnaissance aircraft about his real course, wait for it to leave and then turn again for Tripoli. He may have thought, from the aircraft noise, that torpedo bombers were coming, and he wanted to get into waters farther away from the shore and from Italian minefields in order to gain freedom of manoeuvre. Toscano ordered his gunners to stand by; he may have known that Allied destroyers were astern of his ships, and he wanted to avoid presenting his stern to them because his aft turrets were obstructed by the fuel barrels.

Footnotes

References

Further reading

External links
 Battle Of Cape Bon, Tunisia
 British Navy in the Mediterranean, including Malta Convoys, Part 2
 Dutch destroyer Isaac Sweers
 Italian description
 Battle of Cape Bon Desert War.net

Conflicts in 1941
Allied naval victories in the battle of the Mediterranean
1941 in Italy
Military history of Tunisia
Mediterranean convoys of World War II
Naval battles of World War II involving Italy
Cape Bon
Naval battles of World War II involving the Netherlands
December 1941 events